The Music Teacher is a 1988 Belgian film directed and co-written by Gérard Corbiau. The film was nominated for the Academy Award for Best Foreign Language Film at the 61st Academy Awards.

Plot 
Retired opera singer Joachim Dallayrac (José van Dam) retreats to the countryside to teach two young singers, Sophie (Anne Roussel) and Jean (Philippe Volter). Although the rigorous training takes its toll on both teacher and students, there is plenty of time for relationships to develop among the three.

Cast

See also
 List of submissions to the 61st Academy Awards for Best Foreign Language Film
 List of Belgian submissions for the Academy Award for Best Foreign Language Film

References

External links
 
 

Belgian musical drama films
Films about music and musicians
Films directed by Gérard Corbiau
1980s French-language films
French-language Belgian films